Imma asaphoneura is a moth in the family Immidae. It was described by Edward Meyrick in 1934. It is found in Taiwan.

References

Moths described in 1934
Immidae
Moths of Asia